Randie Carver (December 3, 1974 – September 14, 1999) was an American professional boxer from Kansas City, Missouri.

Amateur career
Carver had an outstanding amateur career, winning the 1993 National Golden Gloves Light middleweight championship.

Death
In the fight against Kabary Salem in September 1999, Carver was headbutted repeatedly during the early rounds in a foul filled bout.
He was knocked down in the 10th round and tried unsuccessfully four times to get to his feet. He then lost consciousness and was rushed to the hospital. Carver died two days later from blunt head trauma received during the fight.

References

External links
 

1974 births
1999 deaths
Sportspeople from Kansas City, Missouri
Boxers from Missouri
Super-middleweight boxers
Deaths due to injuries sustained in boxing
Sports deaths in Missouri
American male boxers
National Golden Gloves champions